Guanine deaminase also known as cypin, guanase, guanine aminase, GAH, and guanine aminohydrolase is an aminohydrolase enzyme which converts guanine to xanthine. Cypin is a major cytosolic protein that interacts with PSD-95. It promotes localized microtubule assembly in neuronal dendrites.

References

External links 
 
 

EC 3.5.4